Shurpanakha (Sanskrit: शूर्पणखा), also known as Meenakshi, is a rakshasi (demoness) in Hindu Mythology. Her legends are mainly narrated in the epic Ramayana and its other versions. She was the sister of Lanka's king, Ravana, and the daughter of the sage Vishrava and the rakshasi Kaikeshi. Shurpanakha's role in the original epic is small, yet significant.

Appearance

Shurpanakha's appearance has drastic differences in the different versions of the epic. Most versions including the Valmiki's Ramayana mention her to be an ugly woman. When Shurpanakha first sees Rama in the forest, Valmiki describes her as facially unpleasant, pot-bellied, wry-eyed, coppery-haired, ugly featured, brassy-voiced, deplorably oldish, a crooked talker, ill-mannered, uncouth and abominable. In contrast, the Kamba Ramayanam describes her as a lovelorn and beautiful woman, attributing her behaviour to loneliness and thus humanising her.

Early life
Kaikesi, daughter of Sumali, married Maharshi Vishrava and became his second wife. She gave birth to five children  four sons and a daughter. Four sons were Sahasraskanda (later known as Sahastra Ravan), Ravan, Kumbhakarna, and Vibhishan.The daughter was named Shurpanakha. She was also given the name of Mīnakṣī "Dīkṣa" at birth, and some also called her "Candraṇakhā" (the one with nails like the moon). According to some Bengali/Odishi folklores, when Shurpanakha was young, She used to take the form of a beautiful woman to lure young unmarried men who were not from Lanka, after that she used to give them a magical potion she stole from Goddess Rati. After drinking the potion, those men used to shrink in size, their height used to become 1-1.5 anguli pramana (5-6 inches). Then she used to gift those men to many unmarried maidens in Lanka . When Ravana's son Meghnada captured Indra, Shurpanakha was attracted to Indra and used that magical potion on Indra. But before she could fullfill her lust, Indra escaped.

Marriage and widowhood
The popular story of Shurpanakha's marriage originated from a Tamil folktale and was absorbed into the Ramayana. As per the story, when Shurpanakha grew up, she secretly married the Danava prince of the Kalkeya Danava clan, Vidyutjihva. Ravana became enraged with Shurpanakha for marrying a Danava. The Danavas were the mortal enemies of Rakshasas, and he was about to punish her, but Mandodari convinced him to respect the wishes of his sister. Thus Ravana accepted Shurpanakha, her husband and Danavas as relatives officially.

At the time of conquering Rasatala (the underworld), Ravana killed Vidyutjihva. The reason of Ravana's act is different from text to text Some claim that he accidentally killed Vidyutjihva, while other state that in Shurpanakha's absence, Vidyutjihva attacked Ravana, who in self-defense killed his brother-in-law. This caused Shurpanakha a great displeasure, and after seeing his sister's grief, Ravana asked her to roam and search for another husband. Shurpanakha then split her time between Lanka and the woods of Southern India, sometimes living with her forest-dwelling Asura relatives, Khara and Dushana, on Ravana's orders. She also had conceived a son by Vidyutjihva known as Shambhri who was accidentally killed by Lakshmana.

Encounter with Rama, Sita and Lakshmana

According to Valmiki, she met the exiled Prince Rama of Ayodhya, during one such visit to the Forest of Panchavati, and was instantly smitten by his youthful good looks. She adopted a beautiful form to entice him, but Rama meanwhile kindly rejected her advances, telling her that he was faithful to his wife Sita and thus would never take another wife. Rejected, Shurpanakha then approached his younger brother, Lakshmana, who said that he is only second to Ram and therefore not worthy of her. Infuriated by their dismissals, the humiliated and envious Shurpanakha returned to her demonic form and attacked Sita, but was thwarted by Lakshmana, who cut off her nose.

Shurpanakha first went to her brother Khara, who sent seven Rakshasa warriors to attack Rama, who easily despatched them. Khara himself then attacked, along with 14,000 soldiers, all of whom were killed except for  Akampana, Sumali's son and Kaikesi's brother, who fled to Lanka. She then fled to Ravana's court and spoke to her brother of the disgrace she had suffered. Her brother, hearing of Sita's beauty, decided to kidnap Sita. Akampana too played a key role in instigating Sita's kidnapping by Ravana. Despite opposition from their brother, Vibhishana, Ravana kidnapped Sita, thus triggering the Battle of Lanka.

Later life and death
Although Shurpanakha receives no further mention from Valmiki, it has been suggested that she continued to live in Lanka after Vibhishana succeeded Ravana as king. She and her half-sister Kumbini are supposed to have perished at sea a few years later, tragically.

References

Sources
 

 Ramayana, A condensed prose version of the epic by C. Raja Gopalachari. Published by Bhavan's Book University
 Valmiki. Ramayana: Aranya Kandha
 Valmiki Ramayan by Rajshekhar Basu - Uttarkanda

External links

Rakshasa in the Ramayana